South Island is a national park in North Queensland (Australia), 692 km northwest of Brisbane.

See also 
 Protected areas of Queensland

References 

National parks of Queensland
Islands of Queensland
Protected areas established in 1941
North Queensland